The 2020–21 American Eagles women's basketball team will represent the American University Eagles during the 2020–21 NCAA Division I women's basketball season. The Eagles will be led by eighth-year head coach Megan Gebbia and play their home games at Bender Arena as members of the Patriot League.

Previous season
They finished the previous season 13–17, 8–10 in Patriot League play to finish in fifth place. They advanced to the Quarterfinals of the Patriot League tournament before losing to Boston University. The tournament was cancelled after the Quarterfinals due to the COVID-19 pandemic. The NCAA tournament and NIT were also cancelled due to the pandemic.

Roster

Schedule

|-
!colspan=9 style=| Non-conference regular season
|-
!colspan=9 style=| Patriot League regular season

|-
!colspan=12 style=| Patriot League tournament
|-

See also
2020–21 American Eagles men's basketball team

References

American
American Eagles women's basketball seasons